Freydis Halla Einarsdóttir (born 3 October 1994) is an Icelandic alpine ski racer.  She was a student at Plymouth State University in Plymouth, New Hampshire.

She is currently studying medicine in Iceland. 

She competed at the 2015 World Championships in Beaver Creek, USA, in the slalom.

She competed for Iceland in alpine skiing at the 2018 Winter Olympics, in Pyeongchang, South Korea.  During the opening ceremony, she was the flag bearer for her country in the Parade of Nations.

References

External links

1994 births
Freydis Halla Einarsdottir
Living people
Alpine skiers at the 2018 Winter Olympics
Olympic alpine skiers of Iceland
Icelandic expatriates in the United States
Plymouth State University alumni
Sportspeople from Reykjavík
21st-century Icelandic women